The Turkestan lynx (Lynx lynx isabellinus) is a subspecies of Eurasian lynx native to Central Asia. It is also known as Central Asian lynx, Tibetan lynx or Himalayan lynx. It is widespread from Central Asia, continental South Asia to China and Mongolia. About 27,000 mature individuals have been estimated to occur in China as of 2013.

Taxonomy
Felis isabellina was the scientific name proposed by Edward Blyth in 1847 for a lynx skin from Tibet.
Lynx lynx wardi was proposed by Richard Lydekker in 1904. However, most authors considered it as synonymous to Lynx lynx isabelinus. Further investigations are in need in order to declare it whether as a separate subspecies or not. As of today, wardi is sometimes regarded as a synonym to isabellinus.

Distribution and habitat
The Turkestan lynx occurs in Central Asia from Turkmenistan, Uzbekistan, Kazakhstan, Tajikistan, Kyrgyzstan, Afghanistan to Pakistan, India, Nepal, Bhutan and China. It lives mostly in open woodlands, steppe and rocky hills.

Conservation 
The Turkestan lynx has been protected under Schedule I of India's Wild Life (Protection) Act, 1972.
In Afghanistan, it is considered threatened.
It is listed as Near Threatened on Pakistan's and Mongolia's national Red Lists.
It is listed as Endangered in China, Turkmenistan, Tajikistan and as Vulnerable in Nepal and Uzbekistan.

References

Eurasian lynx subspecies
Mammals described in 1915
Taxa named by Edward Blyth
Felids of India
Mammals of Central Asia
Fauna of South Asia
Fauna of Tibet
Fauna of the Himalayas
Mammals of Afghanistan
Mammals of Bhutan
Mammals of China
Mammals of India
Mammals of Mongolia
Mammals of Nepal
Mammals of Pakistan
Mammals of Russia
Fauna of Jammu and Kashmir